The 15th Utah Senate District is located in Utah County and includes Utah House Districts 58, 59, 60, 61, 62 and 64.

Previous Utah state senators (District 15)

Election results

2006 general election

See also
 Utah Democratic Party
 Utah Republican Party
 Utah Senate

15
Utah County, Utah